Smin is a village in Shabla Municipality, Dobrich Province, northeastern Bulgaria.

Smin Peak on Trinity Peninsula in Antarctica is named after the village.

References

Villages in Dobrich Province